Moiz Shahid is a cricketer who played for the United Arab Emirates. Moiz is a right-handed batsman and a left-arm seam bowler. Moiz made his debut for the UAE against Singapore in the 2009 ACC Twenty20 Cup. During the tournament he finished as the UAE's leading wicket taker.

External links

Match winning haul in ACC T20 Championship on Gulf News
UAE Coach happy with new find on The National

Living people
Emirati cricketers
1988 births
People from the Emirate of Sharjah